Maxi D was a Macedonian discount supermarket chain, a part of the Skopski pazar AD Skopje company. The company also owned the supermarket chain SP market. Skopski pazar's supermarket chain was one of the biggest in the Republic of North Macedonia.

The discounts Maxi D were the first product that Skopski pazar AD Skopje exported outside Skopje and Maxi D became the fastest growing brand of the company. Maxi D went out of business in 2018.

Locations 

Maxi D has established itself in 5 stores in:
Skopje

Slogans 
Supermarkets: "Welcome neighbor" "More pleasure"
Discounts: "Maxi D - my true friend"

See also 
SP market
Skopski pazar AD Skopje
Restaurant 14
SP Planet

External links 
 
Skopski pazar AD Skopje
SP market
Restaurant 14 - Skopje

Supermarkets of North Macedonia
Companies based in Skopje
Macedonian companies established in 2004